General Hospital Kaltungo is a government established hospital located in Kaltungo local government area of Gombe state, Nigeria. It provides medical and health care services to the community. 

Recently, the hospital had undergone renovation and rehabilitation   by the state government so as to make it a Special Referral Centre for people seeking quality medical services, particularly those from the southern part of the state and beyond.

External link 
General Hospital Kaltungo

References 

Hospitals in Nigeria
Gombe State